Doncaster Rovers Football Club is a professional association football club based in Doncaster, South Yorkshire, England. The team compete in League Two, the fourth tier of the English football league system. The club play their home games at The Eco-Power Stadium, having moved from Belle Vue in 2007. Their home strip consists of red and white hoops, which has been the main design of the club's home shirt since 2001 through different variations. Rovers often sport a third kit each season promoting mental health charity Campaign Against Living Miserably (CALM), with proceeds of the particular home games being donated to said charity.

The club was founded in 1879 and turned professional six years later, moving to the Intake Ground. They entered the Midland League in 1891 and were elected into the Football League in 1901. The club lost re-election votes in 1903 and 1905 and so returned to the Midland League. They were admitted into the Football League for a third and final time in 1923 and went on to win the Third Division North in 1934–35. The club won two further Third Division North titles in 1946–47 and 1949–50, having been relegated from the Second Division in 1937 and 1948. Doncaster found themselves in the Fourth Division after suffering successive relegations in 1958 and 1959, though would win the Fourth Division title in 1965–66 and 1968–69. The club continued to move between the third and fourth tiers, winning promotions in 1980–81 and 1983–84 and relegations in 1983 and 1988, before suffering relegation into non-League football in 1998.

Doncaster regained their Football League status after winning the 2003 Conference play-offs and then went on to win the Third Division title in 2003–04. They won the Football League Trophy in 2007 and the next year won the League One play-offs to secure a place in the second tier for the first time. They spent four of the next five seasons in the Championship, winning the League One title in 2012–13, though were relegated out of the Championship in 2012 and 2014. Relegated into League Two in 2016, they won an immediate promotion in 2016–17 and remained in League One until their relegation in 2022.

History

Early years
The club was formed in 1879 by Albert Jenkins, a fitter at Doncaster's Great Northern Railway works. He gathered together some friends to play a match against the Yorkshire Institute for the Deaf and Dumb in September 1879. The institute side took a 4–0 lead but the game ended as a 4–4 draw. On walking back from the game, the team took a rest at the Hall Cross, and had a discussion in which they decided to play more and called themselves Doncaster Rovers.

The first match under the name was on 3 October 1879, a draw away against Rawmarsh. The club turned professional in 1885. Gradually, they became the main team in the town, and appear to have had their first professional players in 1887–88.

Rovers first entered the FA Cup in 1888–89, losing 9–1 to Rotherham Town at home. Season 1890–91 was to be a significant move forward. The club were a founder member of the Midland Alliance League and came second. The following season, saw them enter the Sheffield and Hallamshire FA Challenge Cup, beating Sheffield United 2–1 at Bramall Lane to win the final. That same season, they also moved up to the Midland League, becoming Champions in 1896–97 and 1898–99.

They were first elected to the Football League in 1901, as a replacement for New Brighton Tower. Their first season in the League was in fact the one when Doncaster achieved their highest position ever (7th in the Football League Second Division). They only lasted two seasons in the league before being voted out in favour of local rivals Bradford City, having finished the 1902 season in the bottom three.

They spent the following season in the Midland League, only managing 11th place out of 18 but were elected back to Division 2. This time, in 1904–05, Doncaster finished bottom with W3 D2 L29, adrift by 12 points, gaining only 8 points – an unfortunate still standing record. They were voted out once again. The following several seasons saw them finish lower midtable of the Midland League, till between 1910 and 1913 they had greater success. The last few years before the war mediocrity returned, and in August 1914 debts run up over the years led to voluntary liquidation. However, a new club was formed in time for the 1914–15 season and was accepted into the Midland League to continue where the old club had left off. The outbreak of the First World War meant the club closed down, and the army took over its ground using it as a depot.

Inter war period
The Club reformed as a limited company after the war in 1919, rejoining the Midland League a year later playing at their new temporary Bennetthorpe Ground. The first two seasons Rovers finished lower-mid table. The third season they moved to Belle Vue, finished runners up and were accepted into the Football League Division 3 North for 1923–24 to replace Stalybridge Celtic.

The first match back in the Football League was a 0–0 draw against Wigan Borough at Belle Vue on 25 August 1923, with Rovers playing in red tops with white shorts. One of the players in that first match was Rovers legend Tom Keetley who went on to become the Club's highest scorer with 186 goals in 241 appearances. Doncaster ended the season in 9th place. The next few seasons saw them rise towards the top of the table, then decline towards the bottom, before in the early 1930s finishing consistently near the top and finally becoming Champions in 1934–35.

Rovers spent two seasons in Division 2, relegated in 1936–37. However, they did well in the following two seasons before the outbreak of war, being runners up in Division 3 North, with only the champions being promoted at that time.

Second World War – late 1990s
Doncaster Rovers were involved in the longest ever competitive football match, against Stockport County at Edgeley Park on 30 March 1946, in a Division Three (North) cup tie. The match was deadlocked at 2–2 at 90 minutes, and after two 10-minute periods of extra time there was no further score. The rule at that time was that the game would carry on until one team scored. However, after 203 minutes, and with darkness closing in, the game was finally stopped. Fans were said to have left the game, gone home for their tea, and come back to watch the end of the game. The replay, at Doncaster, was won by Rovers 4–0, goals coming from Steven Bain, Billy Mortimer and a late double from Graeme Dunne.

In 1946–47 Doncaster set a record for the most games won in a league season (33), when they won the Third Division North title. The following season saw them relegated from the Second Division, but two years later with Peter Doherty as player-manager, they won the Third Division North again. This time they stayed in the Second Division for eight seasons, their most successful period to date.

During this time, several high class players were with Doncaster including Harry Gregg who kept goal, and was sold to Manchester United in December 1957 for £23,500. At the time, he was the most expensive goalkeeper in the world. He went on to help save lives in the Munich air disaster and was a regular goalkeeper for Northern Ireland. Another player, lesser known outside Doncaster, was Alick Jeffrey. Matt Busby, manager of Manchester United, had lined him up to be bought, however in October 1956 Jeffrey badly broke his leg playing for England under-23s. This ended his move and any chance of what was seen to be an almost certain glittering international career to come.

Billy Bremner, who achieved fame for his playing career with Leeds United and Scotland, managed Doncaster twice, his final spell ending in November 1991 – six years before his death.

Richardson era
During the early 1990s, Ken Richardson, who was later described by detectives as "the type that would trample a two-year-old child to pick up a 2p bit", took over as the majority shareholder of the club. He ploughed a lot of money into Doncaster Rovers with one thing on his mind, a new stadium. When he was refused a new stadium by the council he soon lost interest. Richardson hired three men to torch Belle Vue and planned to sell the ground to developers. The attempt put Richardson in jail for four years, ruined Belle Vue and Rovers were edging closer to relegation. In 1998 Rovers dropped out of the league with a −83 goal difference. He withdrew his financial backing and as a result the club was subject to an administration order. The better players left to ease some of the financial burden but unfortunately, the players who were left at Rovers were just not up to the task. The fans blamed Richardson for effectively destroying Rovers and even a funeral was held at Belle Vue on the last game of the 1997/98 season complete with coffin along Carr House Road. Just weeks after Rovers were relegated, Richardson was found guilty of trying to set fire to the Rovers ground, apparently hoping to pay off the club's debts with the insurance money.

The rise
The Westferry Consortium took over the Club just before the beginning of the 1998–99 season with a commitment to invest heavily in the club. The details of this season are collected in Ian McMahon's book The Only Way Is Up. They also brought in John Ryan as a non-executive chairman and he took over at the end of this season. Having aspirations of returning it to the second tier where he had seen them when he was a boy, he stated he would build a new stadium within ten years, both of which he went on to achieve within the ten years. Doncaster found their best form in 50 years in the 2000s.

After five seasons in the Conference League, under the helm of manager Dave Penney the club returned to the fourth tier (known at the time as Division Three) after winning the 2003 Conference play-off final, in the only sudden death goal (also known as a "Golden Goal" and officially known as "Promotion Goal" in this game) in history of English football promotion play-offs. In 2003–04, the first season they were back in the Football League, Rovers achieved promotion to the third tier as champions. Doncaster were the first team to win the Fourth Division/Third Division (fourth level) Championship three times, 1966, 1969, and 2004. Football League rules state that any team who wins a trophy three times can keep it. When Rovers tried to retain ownership of the actual Third Division trophy, the Football League claimed that Rovers could not keep the trophy because the league names had changed from Fourth to Third Division, and so they had not won that particular league three times. Doncaster were the last team to win Division Three before it was renamed League Two.

In 2005–06, Doncaster beat two Premiership teams in the League Cup – Manchester City and Aston Villa. They reached the quarter finals of the competition where they met Arsenal. They went ahead in normal time and Arsenal equalised, and in extra time Rovers went up for a second time but Gilberto Silva equalised in injury time and the North London side went on to win on penalties.

Penney left in August 2006 feeling he had taken the club as far as he could and was swiftly replaced with former AFC Bournemouth manager Sean O'Driscoll, with Richard O'Kelly as assistant manager.

A new stadium was completed in December 2006. Doncaster's first game at the new Keepmoat Stadium was against Huddersfield Town on New Year's Day, 2007 and the first goal scored at the Stadium was by Mark McCammon.

2007–present
On 1 April 2007, Doncaster Rovers travelled with their new manager to the Millennium Stadium, Cardiff to play Bristol Rovers in the Football League Trophy final. Playing in front of over 59,000 people, this was Rovers' first major cup final in the club's history. They got off to the perfect start when a tap in from Jonathan Forte and a brilliant finish from Paul Heffernan put Rovers 2–0 up within the first 5 minutes. However, after a brave fight back from Bristol Rovers, the game finished 2–2, so it went to extra time. In the second half of extra time a Sean Thornton corner was headed home by skipper Graeme Lee who had come forward from his central defensive position. Doncaster held on to claim their first major trophy.

2007–08 proved to be one of the most exciting seasons in Doncaster's history. After a slow start they were in serious contention for a top-six finish for much of the second half of the season. Defeat away at Cheltenham Town on the final day of the season cost them automatic promotion and they finished third, with Nottingham Forest taking 2nd place. After a 0–0 draw away to Southend United in the playoff semifinals first leg, Rovers beat their opponents 5–1 at home in the second leg including a James Coppinger hat-trick to advance to the League One play-off final at Wembley on Sunday 25 May 2008 where they beat Leeds United 1–0 to move into Football League Championship after a half century absence. A James Hayter headed goal in the 47th minute was enough to secure victory in front of over 75,000 fans at Wembley.

The first half of the 2008–09 season saw Doncaster struggling to adapt to the Championship despite a promising start with an away win over newly relegated Derby County. A long run of bad results saw them bottom of the Championship on 20 December 2008 following a narrow 1–0 defeat to Wolves at home. Rovers managed to turn things around soon after and enjoyed an undefeated run of 8 Championship games, starting with a thrilling 4–2 win at relegation rivals Nottingham Forest on Boxing Day. The win against Sheffield Wednesday on Saturday 14 February was especially memorable considering it was the first time Doncaster had defeated the Owls in any league competition. The streak ended at the hands of Swansea City on Saturday 21 February after a 3–1 defeat at the Liberty Stadium. Doncaster Rovers secured their place in the Championship for the 2009–10 season after an emphatic 3–0 win at Home Park against Plymouth Argyle. Doncaster ended their first season in the Championship comfortably in 14th position, finishing above 8 former Premier League teams, including Charlton Athletic, Watford, Crystal Palace and Derby County. The survival was also a major feat, as before the start of that season, they were tipped by many as strong favourites for relegation.

Doncaster finished the 2009–10 season marginally better than their first season back in the Championship, in 12th and earning two more points than the previous season with 60 points. This was despite a promising period towards the end of the season which saw Doncaster close to the play-off places, thanks in part to Sheffield United loanee Billy Sharp who scored 15 goals during his stay. The 2009–10 season's success became a football league record. Having become the first team to be bottom of the table at Christmas, but still managed to survive the drop.

The 2010–11 season proved to be Doncaster's most trying season in the Championship thus far. Despite a club record signing of £1.15 million for Billy Sharp, the season was plagued by injuries to key players, as well as poor form. They finished in 21st place, 6 points clear of relegated local rivals Sheffield United and Scunthorpe United.

Rovers struggled in the 2011–12 season; seven games into the season, Rovers had failed to win a game ( no wins, one draw, six losses). This led to the sacking of manager Sean O'Driscoll and assistant manager Richard O'Kelly. On 23 September 2011, Dean Saunders was unveiled as the new boss, leaving Wrexham. His reign started unbeaten in three games. With the controversial help of football agent Willie McKay, Rovers brought in several players on loans and short-term contracts, and on low wages, including El Hadji Diouf, Pascal Chimbonda, Herita Ilunga, Carl Ikeme, Frédéric Piquionne, and Habib Beye. However, Doncaster were relegated to League One with three games still to play. Many supporters blamed the failure to stay in the Championship on McKay's involvement, others felt it was worth the try. At the end of the 2011–12 season, chairman John Ryan deemed the McKay "experiment" over as it "didn't work" and "wouldn't work in the third tier" anyway.

The squad was rebuilt for the 2012–13 season with 19 players leaving. Expectations were low, but after an average start, Saunders' team ended up firmly in the promotion positions by the end of 2012. On 7 January, Saunders filled the vacant managers position at Wolves and on 17 January caretaker manager Brian Flynn was given the permanent managers job till the end of the season with Rob Jones as player coach. In an incredible finale to the season at Griffin Park, they beat Brentford 0–1 when James Coppinger scored in the last seconds of 5 minutes of added time, only seconds after Brentford's Marcello Trotta had hit a penalty against the crossbar. If Brentford had won, they would have been promoted and Doncaster would have to compete in the play-offs. As it was, the goal put Doncaster one point above Bournemouth as champions.

Following promotion to the Championship for the 2013–14 season, Brian Flynn was moved to become Director of Football and overseeing the newly formed development squad which would be playing competitive games. Paul Dickov was brought in as manager with Brian Horton as his assistant. To boost support for their chosen charity, Bluebell Wood Children's Hospice, the club signed One Direction singer Louis Tomlinson on a non-contract basis.

On 9 November, John Ryan gave an emotional farewell and stepped down as Chairman of the Club after 15 years, minutes before the kick-off against a Championship encounter against Barnsley at Oakwell, amid reports of boardroom disagreements following a proposed takeover bid by a hedge-fund consortium led by Sequentia Capital. On 3 May 2014, Doncaster were relegated back to League One after just one season following a 1–0 defeat to Leicester City on the final day of the season.

Rovers finished the 2014–15 season in 13th place, before being relegated to League Two after finishing 21st in 2015–16 with new manager Darren Ferguson. The 2016–17 season saw them being promoted back to League One at the first attempt in 3rd position, missing out on the title on the final day of the season.

Darren Ferguson left his post in June 2018 and was replaced by another former Peterborough boss in Grant McCann ahead of the 2018–19 season. Under McCann, Rovers finished sixth in League One, qualifying for the end of season play-offs where they faced Charlton Athletic over two legs. A 2–1 defeat in the first leg and an early Krystian Bielik goal in the second left Rovers with a mountain to climb at The Valley, but goals from  captain Tommy Rowe and Andy Butler forced extra time. John Marquis put Rovers ahead for the first time in extra time, only for Darren Pratley to equalise a minute later. Rovers lost the penalty shoot-out 4–3 with misses coming from Rowe and Marquis as they fell just short of making the Wembley Stadium showdown.

McCann left in the summer for Championship side Hull City and was replaced by former defender Darren Moore ahead of the 2019–20 campaign. With the club sitting around the play-offs in December, the club's season looked to be going well. However, Moore moved to struggling Sheffield Wednesday on 1 March 2021, and Andy Butler was appointed as interim manager for the remainder of the season. Doncaster finished the season in 14th place in League One.

For the 2021–22 season, former trophy winning Doncaster Rovers player Richie Wellens was installed as first team manager, with Noel Hunt as assistant manager. Wellens was relieved of his duties as Doncaster Rovers manager on the 2 December 2021. Doncaster appointed then under-18s manager Gary McSheffrey as the interim manager, later deciding that McSheffrey was a good fit, and gave him the position full-time on the 29 December 2021. Doncaster Rovers finished the season in 22nd place, relegating them to League Two.

Players

Current squad

{{Fs player|no=2|nat=IRL|pos=DF|name=James Brown (on loan from Blackburn Rovers)}}

(on loan from Burton Albion)

Out on loan

Academy

The youth system currently has Category 3 status with the U18 academy team playing in the EFL Youth Alliance North East Conference league.

Non-playing staff

Stadium

1885–1915 – Intake Ground

For the first six years the club began playing their games wherever they could, on playing fields at Town Moor and the Racecourse. They gained a permanent ground in 1885 when they started playing their games near the Institute for the Deaf and Dumb and so was known as the Deaf and Dumb Ground. A year later the stadium was officially named as the Intake Ground. A few months after completion, the roof blew off the stand, and the same happened in 1894 on the press and team officials stand after a gale. They played their football there until August 1914  when the club went into liquidation. A new company did take over the club soon after but all English league competition was suspended in 1915 due to the First World War and the club was closed down and the ground turned into an Army depot.

1920–1922 – Bennetthorpe Ground
When the Club was reformed after the war in the summer of 1919, the Army were still occupying the old Intake Ground as a depot. They had wanted to move to Low Pastures but restrictions set by the local council meant this was not a viable option. The Club did not join the Midland League until 1920–21, by which time and as a temporary solution, a field was found on the south side of Bennetthorpe for which they were given a two-year lease. On the first day of the second season (1921–22) there, in the Midland League, the Bennetthorpe Ground saw 7,219 people watch Rovers against Gainsborough Trinity. The ground consisted of a small stand on one side and small organised terraces around the pitch. Some of the fencing/gates on Town Moor Avenue remain.

1922–2006 – Low Pasture, Belle Vue

With council restrictions on the six acre Low Pastures site having been satisfactorily negotiated, the Club moved there for the beginning of the 1922–23 season. Large amounts of ash from nearby coal tips was laid as a base for the pitch, serving it well throughout its years of use with superb drainage. Initially, there was a stand for 4,000 seated fans with terracing in front for another 3,000. The ground had a unique feature in that home and away teams had separate entrances. The stadium was opened in 1922 by Charles Sutcliffe, a representative of the Football League when it was named Belle Vue. The first match there was against Gainsborough Trinity in the Midland League with an attendance of 10,000. After two years, shelter was added for standing spectators on the "Popular Side". A few years later in 1927, the stand from the Bennetthorpe Ground was jacked up and moved to the new venue providing a sheltered stand at the "Town End". The "Popular Side" was extended in 1927 and concreted in 1928. Turnstiles, gates and fencing were added in 1935, and in 1938 the "Popular Side" stand roof was replaced and put further back increasing the capacity of Belle Vue to 40,000. In 1947 the stadium recorded its highest attendance of 37,099 against Hull City, although apocryphal accounts refute this and claim that many more gained entry to the ground by climbing over walls and thus avoided having to pay.

Following the Bradford City stadium fire disaster, in 1985 the wooden "Cow Shed", as the old Bennetthorpe stand was known, had to be removed for safety reasons. Mining subsidence in 1987 meant much of the "Pop Side" was removed, drastically reducing the grounds capacity to around 10,000. Further safety conditions imposed after the Hillsborough disaster led the capacity to fall to 7,294.

When the Westferry Consortium took over the club in 1998 one of the first guarantees was to help establish a new stadium for the club. Belle Vue had never been upgraded heavily since 1938 and despite minor cosmetic changes and the addition of some seating was really showing its age by the time Westferry took over. Despite this, some improvements were made in the last few years of its use as the Club rose out of the Conference, through Division 3 and into League 1. The Town End terracing was made safe and usable with portacabins added as executive stands behind it. The Rossington End was also extended and updated, with the capacity in its final years rising to around 11,500.

In 2003 it was renamed the Earth Stadium after Earth Finance started sponsoring the ground. Belle Vue was Doncaster's home for 84 years.

2007–present – Keepmoat/Eco-Power Stadium

A new 15,231 all-seated stadium owned by Doncaster Metropolitan Borough Council and rented by the club, was completed in December 2006. The first game at the new Keepmoat Stadium was against Huddersfield Town on New Year's Day, 2007. The game also saw the first three red cards in the new stadium. Doncaster Rovers' centre forward Mark McCammon was the first player ever to score on the new pitch in a football match. The official opening of the Keepmoat Stadium was on 3 August 2007, with Doncaster Rovers playing a Manchester United XI in front of a crowd of 13,080. United won the game 2–0 with Anderson making his debut for them.

On 19 June 2012 it was confirmed that Doncaster Rovers F.C. had secured a 99 Year operating lease from Doncaster Metropolitan Borough Council to lead the management of the Keepmoat stadium with a view to improving operating results. The change placed the Club back in charge of its home Stadium after the period of renting since its move from Belle Vue (also leased from the Council) in 2007.

On 11 August 2012, the stadium was officially handed over to chairman John Ryan in a presentation before the League Cup tie with York City.

On 27 December 2021, the stadium underwent a name change in line with the sponsorship rights being handed over from Keepmoat Homes to the Eco-Power Group

Training facilities
Doncaster train at Cantley Park which has been their main training facility since June 2000. The site was originally leased from Case IH.

Crests

Like most of the early English football clubs, the original crest adopted by Doncaster Rovers was that of the local coat of arms. The coat of arms of Doncaster at the time was of two lions holding Yorkshire roses in their mouths as well as a red shield depicting the old medieval Doncaster Castle. The coat of arms is primarily red and white which explains the team's decision to adopt red and white as their colours. The club stopped using Doncaster's coat of arms in 1972 when the Viking crest was introduced.

In the sixties Doncaster council denied Rovers permission to use the coat of arms and therefore a competition was held, from which the best design would be selected as the club's new badge. The winner and current crest was designed by a group of local students and named "the Viking".

When the new crest was introduced it included a monochrome Viking image overlaying a red and white circle, which denoted the club's colours, along with the year of the club's formation 1879. The Viking image would become known as "The Turk's Head". Also included on the crest was a shield with the club's initials – D.R.F.C. as well as the Yorkshire white rose in reference to the club's location. The inset shield was also coloured red and white to denote the team colours. In the early 1990s the crest was altered, omitting the red and white circle background and the Viking image was coloured gold.

A further modification to the Doncaster Rovers crest was introduced in 2006 and used until 2012. This version included a new Yorkshire rose design on the shield as well as a slightly different Viking image in dark yellow.

The club reverted to the previously used design in 2012 with a two-tone gold background. This is the version still in use by the club today.

Honours

League
English third tier
Champions: 2012–13
Play-off winners: 2007–08
— Northern half
— Champions: 1934–35, 1946–47, 1949–50
— Runners-up: 1937–38, 1938–39

English fourth tier
Champions: 1965–66, 1968–69, 2003–04
Runners-up: 1983–84
Promoted: 1980–81, 2016–17

English fifth tier
Play-off winners: 2002–03

Midland Football League
Champions: 1896–97, 1898–99
Runners-up: 1900–01, 1922–23

Midland Alliance League
Runners-up: 1890–91

Yorkshire League
Runners-up: 1898–99

Cup
Football League Trophy
2006–07

Sheffield and Hallamshire County Cup
1935–36, 1937–38, 1940–41, 1955–56, 1967–68, 1975–76, 1985–86

Conference Cup
1998–99, 1999–2000

League history

Doncaster Rovers have played their football in the following leagues:

Midland Alliance League
1890–91

Midland Football League:
1891–92 to 1900–01,
1903–04,
1905–06 to 1922–23

Football League:
1901–02 to 1902–03,
1904–05,
1923–24 to 1997–98,
2003–04 to Present

2nd Tier – Division 2, Championship:
1901–02 to 1902–03,
1904–05,
1935–36 to 1936–37,
1947–48,
1950–51 to 1957–58,
2008–09 to 2011–12,
2013–14

3rd Tier – Division 3 North, Division 3, League 1:
1923–24 to 1934–35,
1937–38 to 1946–47,
1948–49 to 1949–50,
1958–59,
1966–67,
1969–70 to 1970–71,
1981–82 to 1982–83,
1984–85 to 1987–88,
2004–05 to 2007–08,
2012–13, 2014–15 to 2015–16, 2017–18 to 2020–21

4th Tier – Division 4, Division 3:
1959–60 to 1965–66,
1967–68 to 1968–69,
1971–72 to 1980–81,
1983–84,
1988–89 to 1997–98,
2003–04, 2016–17,
2022–23 to Present

5th Tier – Football Conference
1998–99 to 2002–03

Last 10 seasons

Pos = Position; P = Played; W = Won; D = Drawn; L = Lost; F = Goals for; A = Goals against; GD = Goal difference; Pts = Points

Managerial history

Kits and sponsorship

From 1879 to 1885 Doncaster played in blue and white, and since then red and white. The club's first strip was a navy blue and white strip with a yellow diagonal cross. The kit uniquely included a blue Tam o' Shanter with a red toorie at the centre. A solid red shirt with a black collar was the first design adopted when the club first entered the English Football league in 1901. Since 2001 the club have played in a red and white hooped home shirt.

The home shirts have been red and white hooped (44 seasons), solid red (37), solid white (18), and red and white striped (10).

LNER pledged their sponsorship for 2 further years after the 2018–2019 season. Stoneacre also agreed a new contract with the club to last until the end of the 2021–2022 season extending the partnership to 13 years.

*This sponsor appears on the back of the home kit

Player of the Year
The following players have won Doncaster Rovers Player of the year award.

Records

Other teams
Doncaster Rovers Belles have historically been one of the most successful sides in the women's game, however over recent years, partly due to highly controversial FA decisions and policy, they have fallen down the league ladder. They were formed by Rover's lottery ticket saleswomen in 1969 as Belle Vue Belles. They merged with the Official DRFC Women's side in 2003 becoming Doncaster Rovers Belles, though they were still run independently. In 2019 they became part of Club Doncaster. They currently play in the FA Women's National League Division One Midlands. Their home games are played at Oxford Street, Rossington.

Whilst not affiliated in any way to the English club, Doncaster Rovers of Melbourne, Australia, who play in the Victoria Leagues, were formed in 1967 and named after them.

Mascot
The team's mascot, previously portrayed by Andrew Liney, is a brown dog known as Donny Dog that wears a red and white Rovers jersey. Before a scheduled appearance during the game against Huddersfield Town at the Galpharm Stadium on 4 March 2006, police prevented Liney from entering the stadium in costume, citing unspecified "police intelligence", and refused him permission to wear any part of the costume within 50 metres of the stadium. Mr Liney later received a full written apology for these unfounded allegations from the head of West Yorkshire Police. The mascot was next portrayed by Tracy Chandler and in June 2011, she was relieved from the position after she posed in her underwear for a Sunday newspaper. Later in the same week she was reinstated back as the club's mascot.

A second mascot, a yellow haired and bearded Viking with a helmet and wearing the away shirt named Eric the Viking, made its first appearance at the home game against Yeovil on 25 February 2013.

Fanzine
Doncaster Rovers' fanzine is called "Popular Stand" which was first launched in January 1998. Previously there have been several other fanzines "Raise The Roof", "Warboys is still God" and "Keegan Was Crap Really" which are no longer being published. The fanzine sells at £1 which is the same price as when it was first published in 1998. All of its profits of the fanzine are donated to Doncaster Rovers or related causes. Popular Stand is currently edited by Glen Wilson.

In 2016 Popular Stand won the Football Supporters' Federation Fanzine of the Year.

Rivalries
Doncaster Rovers' main rivals are Rotherham United, Barnsley, and Scunthorpe United, with Sheffield Wednesday, Sheffield United, Chesterfield, Leeds United, Mansfield Town and Nottingham Forest all being rivalries to a lesser extent.

TV
In 1998 Rovers featured in a documentary on Yorkshire Television. This episode titled "Trading Places" documents and contrasts the 1997–98 season for two of the region's football clubs; Rovers heading out of the Football League and Halifax Town heading the opposite the way as Champions of the Conference. Also in 1998 the club was featured in the 1998 Channel 5 'fly-on-the-wall' documentary "They Think It's All Rovers" in which it showed the fall of Rovers. In the early 1980s there was a documentary about Billy Bremner as the manager of Rovers. The documentary is notable not only for the inside look at the pre-match preparations, warm-up conducted in the dressing rooms, starting line-up read out as if it is coming to Bremner there and then, but for such rare footage of early 1980s Belle Vue, with a full-size Popular Stand and the Cow Shed still standing at the Town End.

References

External links

 Official website
 Doncaster Rovers club and player records and statistics at Statto.com

 
Football clubs in England
Sport in Doncaster
Association football clubs established in 1879
Football clubs in South Yorkshire
English Football League clubs
EFL Trophy winners
1879 establishments in England
Sheffield & Hallamshire County FA members
Midland Football League (1889)
National League (English football) clubs
Companies that have entered administration in the United Kingdom